Thirteen vessels of the Royal Navy and its predecessors have borne the name George.

George was a ship built in 1338 on the River Hamble.
 was a Genoese carrack of 600 tons (bm) that the British captured on 15 August 1416 and that the navy sold on 10 August 1425
George was a balinger of 120 tons (bm), built at Smallhithe in 1420 and sold in August 1425.
 was a ship of 80 tons (bm) and 28 guns, purchased in 1564 and listed until 1557.
George was a hoy of 50 tons (bm), listed 1564–1585.
Gerge was a hoy of 100 tons (bm), purchased in 1588 and listed until 1603.
George was a fire ship listed in 1652.
 was a Dutch dogger of 8 guns, captured in 1672 and sold in 1674.
HMS George was a fire ship of six guns and 393 tons (bm), purchased in 1672 and sunk as a foundation at Sheerness in 1674.
 was a schooner on the Canadian Lakes listed in 1755 that the French captured at Oswego on 14 August 1756.
George was a hired ship's tender listed in 1774 and wrecked on 26 December 1776 in poor weather at Piscatagua, New Hampshire.
 was a sloop of six guns and 105 tons (bm), captured in 1796 that two Spanish privateers captured in the West Indies on 3 January 1798.
 was a sailing barge of 61 tons (bm) and two or three guns purchased in March 1794 and sold in October 1798.

Notes, citations, and references
Notes

Citations

References
 
 

Royal Navy ship names